Garfield County is a county located in the U.S. state of Oklahoma. As of the 2010 census, the population was 60,580. Enid is the county seat and largest city within Garfield County. The county is named after President James A. Garfield.

Garfield County comprises the Enid, OK Metropolitan Statistical Area.

Prior to the Land Run of 1893, Garfield County was named O County and was part of the Cherokee Outlet, occupied by the Cherokee people following the Treaty of New Echota and the Cherokee trail of tears. Historically, the area was a hunting ground for the Wichita, Osage, and Kiowa tribes.

The Chisholm Trail, stage coach lines, mail routes, and railroads passed through stations at Buffalo Springs and Skeleton, today known as Bison and Enid. Railroad development in the county began four years prior to the land opening. Enid became a central hub within the county. Historical railroads included Enid and Tonkawa Railway, Enid and Anadarko Railway, Blackwell, Enid and Southwestern Railway, Enid Central Railway and the Denver, Enid and Gulf Railroad.

Geography
Several creeks run through the county, including Black Bear, Boggy, Red Rock, Rock, Skeleton, and Turkey.

Adjacent counties
 Grant County (north)
 Noble County (east)
 Logan County (southeast)
 Kingfisher County (south)
 Major County (west)
 Alfalfa County (northwest)

Major highways
  U.S. Highway 60
  U.S. Highway 64
  U.S. Highway 81
  U.S. Highway 412
  State Highway 15
  State Highway 45
  State Highway 74

Demographics

As of the census of 2000, there were 57,813 people, 23,175 households, and 15,805 families residing in the county.  The population density was 55 people per square mile (21/km2).  There were 26,047 housing units at an average density of 25 per square mile (10/km2).  The racial makeup of the county was 88.65% White, 3.26% Black or African American, 2.11% Native American, 0.85% Asian, 0.49% Pacific Islander, 2.02% from other races, and 2.62% from two or more races.  4.13% of the population were Hispanic or Latino of any race.

There were 23,175 households, out of which 31.40% had children under the age of 18 living with them, 54.20% were married couples living together, 10.50% had a female householder with no husband present, and 31.80% were non-families. 27.70% of all households were made up of individuals, and 12.10% had someone living alone who was 65 years of age or older.  The average household size was 2.42 and the average family size was 2.95.

In the county, the population was spread out, with 25.00% under the age of 18, 9.10% from 18 to 24, 27.30% from 25 to 44, 22.50% from 45 to 64, and 16.00% who were 65 years of age or older.  The median age was 38 years. For every 100 females there were 93.70 males.  For every 100 females age 18 and over, there were 90.40 males.

The median income for a household in the county was $33,006, and the median income for a family was $39,872. Males had a median income of $29,921 versus $20,791 for females. The per capita income for the county was $17,457.  About 10.50% of families and 13.90% of the population were below the poverty line, including 19.70% of those under age 18 and 10.40% of those age 65 or over.

Politics

Economy
Primary industries in Garfield County are agriculture and livestock. Historically, crops have included wheat, corn, oats, sorghum, Kaffir corn, and alfalfa. In addition, oil and gas and flour milling have proved fruitful for the county. The county seat of Enid, Oklahoma has the most grain storage capacity in the United States and one of the largest grain elevators in the world. Vance Air Force Base is also a major employer in the area of both airmen and civilians.

Communities

Cities
 Enid (county seat)
 Garber

Towns

 Breckenridge
 Carrier
 Covington
 Douglas
 Drummond
 Fairmont
 Hillsdale
 Hunter
 Kremlin
 Lahoma
 North Enid
 Waukomis

Census-designated place
 Bison

Other unincorporated places
 Blanton
 Etna
 Hayward

NRHP sites

The following sites in Garfield County are listed on the National Register of Historic Places:

Covington
 Kimmell Barn
 R. E. Hoy No. 1 Oil Well

Enid

Hunter
 Bank of Hunter

References

Further reading

 Rockwell, Stella, ed., Garfield County, Oklahoma, 1907-1982, Vol. I & II, Garfield Historical Society, Josten's Publishing Company, Topeka, Kansas. 1982.

External links
 Encyclopedia of Oklahoma History and Culture - Garfield County
 Oklahoma Digital Maps: Digital Collections of Oklahoma and Indian Territory

 
1893 establishments in Oklahoma Territory
Populated places established in 1893